The 2014–15 New York Rangers season was the franchise's 88th season of play and their 89th season overall.

The Rangers clinched their third Presidents' Trophy and eighth division title by finishing with the best record in the NHL at 53–22–7. The 53 wins and 113 points both set franchise records. The 113 points marked the eighth time in franchise history that the team had reached the 100-point plateau. The division title was the Rangers' first in the Metropolitan Division, which was created during the NHL's realignment in the 2013 offseason. The team won 28 road games in the regular season, breaking the franchise record set the previous season.

The season marked the third time in four years that the Rangers reached the Eastern Conference Finals.

Off-season
The Rangers used their second compliance buyout on center Brad Richards on June 20, 2014.

Training camp 
On September 24, center Derek Stepan suffered a fractured fibula during on-ice fitness testing, meaning the Rangers would need to start the season without their number one center for four-to-six weeks.

At the conclusion of training camp, Anthony Duclair was named the 2014 winner of the Lars-Erik Sjoberg Award for being the best Rangers rookie in training camp. Duclair, a third round draft pick in 2013, turned heads in camp by scoring in three-straight pre-season games. Duclair was also the only teenager to score five points or more during the pre-season.

On October 6, defenseman Ryan McDonagh was named the 27th captain in New York Rangers history. Dan Girardi, Martin St. Louis, Marc Staal and Derek Stepan were named alternate captains.

Regular season
On October 14, 2014, in a loss to the New York Islanders, Rick Nash established a franchise record by scoring a goal in each of the team's first four games of a season.

On December 27, the Rangers beat the New Jersey Devils 3–1 to extend their winning streak to eight in a row, which was the longest win streak by the Rangers since the 1974–75 season.

The Rangers became the first team to clinch a playoff spot on March 26 with a 5–1 win over the Ottawa Senators with 101 points. It is the eighth time in franchise history the team has reached the 100-point mark.

On April 2, 2015, the Rangers clinched the Metropolitan Division title with a win over the Minnesota Wild, 3–2. This win also made it their 26th road win of the season, a franchise record.

On April 4, 2015, the Rangers defeated the New Jersey Devils 6–1 for their 50th win of the season. This was the fourth time in franchise history that the Rangers achieved a 50 win season.

On April 7, 2015, the Rangers defeated the New Jersey Devils 4–2 to clinch the Presidents' Trophy, the third in franchise history. This win also made it their 27th league-leading road win.

On April 11, 2015, the Rangers beat the Washington Capitals 4–2 to win their 53rd game with 113 points. This is the most wins and points ever by the team, breaking single-season franchise records.

Playoffs

In the first round of the Eastern Conference Quarterfinals, the Rangers played the Pittsburgh Penguins and won the series in five games.

In the second round of the Eastern Conference Semi-finals, the Rangers played the Washington Capitals and won the series in seven games.

During the second round, the Rangers set an NHL record in which 14-straight playoff games were decided by one goal. They also became the first team in NHL history to battle back from a 3–1 deficit in back-to-back seasons.

Standings

Schedule and results

Pre-season

|-  style="text-align:center; background:#fcc;"
| 1 || September 22 || New Jersey Devils || 4–5 || 0–1–0
|- style="text-align:center; background:#cfc;"
| 2 || September 26 || @ Chicago Blackhawks ||4–1 || 1–1–0
|- style="text-align:center; background:#cfc;"
| 3 || September 29 || Philadelphia Flyers || 6–3 || 2–1–0
|-  style="text-align:center; background:#fcc;"
| 4 || September 30 || @ Philadelphia Flyers || 2–4 || 2–2–0
|- style="text-align:center; background:#cfc;"
| 5 || October 3 || Chicago Blackhawks || 3–2 SO || 3–2–0
|-  style="text-align:center; background:#fcc;"
| 6 || October 4 || @ New Jersey Devils || 0–3 || 3–3–0
|-

Regular season

|- style="text-align:center; background:#cfc;"
| 1 || October 9 || @ St. Louis || 3–2 ||  || Lundqvist || Scottrade Center || 19,183 || 1–0–0 || 2 || Recap
|- style="text-align:center; background:#fcc;"
| 2 || October 11 || @ Columbus || 2–5 ||  || Talbot || Nationwide Arena || 18,922 || 1–1–0 || 2 || Recap
|- style="text-align:center; background:#fcc;"
| 3 || October 12 ||  Toronto || 3–6 ||  || Lundqvist || Madison Square Garden || 18,006 || 1–2–0 || 2 || Recap
|- style="text-align:center; background:#fcc;"
| 4 || October 14 ||  NY Islanders || 3–6 ||  || Lundqvist || Madison Square Garden || 18,006 || 1–3–0 || 2 || Recap
|- style="text-align:center; background:#cfc;"
| 5 || October 17 ||  Carolina || 2–1 || SO || Lundqvist || Madison Square Garden || 18,006 || 2–3–0 || 4 || Recap
|- style="text-align:center; background:#cfc;"
| 6 || October 19 ||  San Jose || 4–0 ||  || Lundqvist || Madison Square Garden || 18,006 || 3–3–0 || 6 || Recap
|- style="text-align:center; background:#cfc;"
| 7 || October 21 || @ New Jersey || 4–3 || OT || Lundqvist || Prudential Center || 14,484 || 4–3–0 || 8 || Recap
|- style="text-align:center; background:#fcc;"
| 8 || October 25 || @ Montreal || 1–3 ||  || Lundqvist || Bell Centre || 21,287 || 4–4–0 || 8 || Recap
|- style="text-align:center; background:#cfc;"
| 9 || October 27 ||  Minnesota || 5–4 ||  || Lundqvist || Madison Square Garden || 18,006 || 5–4–0 || 10 || Recap
|-

|- style="text-align:center; background:#fff;"
| 10 || November 1 ||  Winnipeg || 0–1 || SO || Lundqvist || Madison Square Garden || 18,006 || 5–4–1 || 11 || Recap
|- style="text-align:center; background:#fff;"
| 11 || November 3 ||  St. Louis || 3–4 || SO || Talbot || Madison Square Garden || 18,006 || 5–4–2 || 12 || Recap
|- style="text-align:center; background:#cfc;"
| 12 || November 5 ||  Detroit || 4–3 || OT || Lundqvist || Madison Square Garden || 18,006 || 6–4–2 || 14 || Recap
|- style="text-align:center; background:#fcc;"
| 13 || November 8 || @ Toronto || 4–5 ||  || Talbot || Air Canada Centre || 19,320 || 6–5–2 || 14 || Recap
|- style="text-align:center; background:#fcc;"
| 14 || November 9 ||  Edmonton || 1–3 ||  || Lundqvist || Madison Square Garden || 18,006 || 6–6–2 || 14 || Recap
|- style="text-align:center; background:#cfc;"
| 15 || November 11 ||  Pittsburgh || 5–0 || ||Lundqvist  || Madison Square Garden || 18,006  || 7–6–2 ||16 || Recap
|- style="text-align:center; background:#fff;"
| 16 || November 13 ||  Colorado || 3–4 || SO || Lundqvist || Madison Square Garden || 18,006 || 7–6–3 || 17 || Recap
|- style="text-align:center; background:#fff;" 
| 17 || November 15 || @ Pittsburgh || 2–3 || SO || Lundqvist || Consol Energy Center || 18,652 || 7–6–4 || 18 || Recap
|- style="text-align:center; background:#fcc;"
| 18 || November 17 ||  Tampa Bay || 1–5 ||  || Lundqvist || Madison Square Garden || 18,006 || 7–7–4 || 18 || Recap
|- style="text-align:center; background:#cfc;"
| 19 || November 19 ||  Philadelphia || 2–0 ||  || Talbot || Madison Square Garden || 18,006 || 8–7–4 || 20 || Recap
|-  style="text-align:center; background:#ccc;"
| – || November 21 || @ Buffalo ||colspan="8" | Game rescheduled to February 20 due to hazardous weather in Buffalo.
|- style="text-align:center; background:#cfc;"
| 20 || November 23 ||  Montreal || 5–0 ||  || Lundqvist || Madison Square Garden || 18,006 || 9–7–4 || 22 || Recap
|- style="text-align:center; background:#fcc;"
| 21 || November 26 || @ Tampa Bay || 3–4 ||  || Lundqvist || Tampa Bay Times Forum || 19,204 || 9–8–4 || 22 || Recap
|- style="text-align:center; background:#cfc;"
| 22 || November 28 || @ Philadelphia || 3–0 ||  || Talbot  || Wells Fargo Center || 19,969 || 10–8–4 || 24 || Recap
|- style="text-align:center; background:#cfc;"
| 23 || November 29 ||  Philadelphia || 5–2 ||  || Lundqvist  || Madison Square Garden || 18,006 || 11–8–4 || 26 || Recap
|-

|- style="text-align:center; background:#fcc;"
| 24 || December 1 ||  Tampa Bay || 3–6 ||  || Lundqvist || Madison Square Garden || 18,006 || 11–9–4 || 26 || Recap
|- style="text-align:center; background:#fcc;"
| 25 || December 6 || @ Detroit || 2–3 ||  || Talbot || Joe Louis Arena || 20,027 || 11–10–4 || 26 || Recap
|- style="text-align:center; background:#cfc;"
| 26 || December 8 ||  Pittsburgh || 4–3 || OT || Lundqvist || Madison Square Garden || 18,006 || 12–10–4 || 28 || Recap
|- style="text-align:center; background:#cfc;"
| 27 || December 13 || @ Vancouver || 5–1 ||  || Lundqvist || Rogers Arena || 18,870 || 13–10–4 || 30 || Recap
|- style="text-align:center; background:#cfc;"
| 28 || December 14 || @ Edmonton || 2–0 ||  || Lundqvist || Rexall Place || 16,839 || 14–10–4 || 32 || Recap
|- style="text-align:center; background:#cfc;"
| 29 || December 16 || @ Calgary || 5–2 ||  || Lundqvist || Scotiabank Saddledome || 18,352 || 15–10–4 || 34 || Recap
|- style="text-align:center; background:#cfc;"
| 30 || December 20 || @ Carolina || 3–2 || SO || Lundqvist || PNC Arena || 13,329 || 16–10–4 || 36 || Recap
|- style="text-align:center; background:#cfc;"
| 31 || December 21 ||  Carolina || 1–0 ||  || Talbot || Madison Square Garden || 18,006 || 17–10–4 || 38 || Recap
|- style="text-align:center; background:#cfc;"
| 32 || December 23 ||  Washington || 4–2 ||  || Lundqvist || Madison Square Garden || 18,006 || 18–10–4 || 40 || Recap
|- style="text-align:center; background:#cfc;"
| 33 || December 27 ||  New Jersey || 3–1 ||  || Lundqvist || Madison Square Garden || 18,006 || 19–10–4 || 42 || Recap
|- style="text-align:center; background:#fcc;"
| 34 || December 29 || @ Dallas || 2–3 ||  || Lundqvist || American Airlines Center || 18,532 || 19–11–4 || 42 || Recap
|- style="text-align:center; background:#cfc;"
| 35 || December 31 || @ Florida || 5–2 ||  || Lundqvist || BB&T Center || 15,090 || 20–11–4 || 44 || Recap
|-

|- style="text-align:center; background:#cfc;"
| 36 || January 3 ||  Buffalo || 6–1 ||  || Lundqvist || Madison Square Garden || 18,006 || 21–11–4 || 46 || Recap
|- style="text-align:center; background:#cfc;"
| 37 || January 7 || @ Anaheim || 4–1 ||  || Lundqvist || Honda Center || 17,174 || 22–11–4 || 48 || Recap
|- style="text-align:center; background:#cfc;"
| 38 || January 8 || @ Los Angeles || 4–3 || || Talbot || Staples Center || 18,230 || 23–11–4 ||  50 || Recap
|- style="text-align:center; background:#cfc;"
| 39 || January 10 || @ San Jose || 3–1 ||  || Lundqvist || SAP Center at San Jose || 17,562 || 24–11–4 || 52 || Recap
|- style="text-align:center; background:#fcc;"
| 40 || January 13 ||  NY Islanders || 0–3 || || Lundqvist || Madison Square Garden || 18,006 || 24–12–4 || 52 || Recap
|- style="text-align:center; background:#fcc;"
| 41 || January 15 || @ Boston || 0–3 ||  || Talbot || TD Garden || 17,565 || 24–13–4 || 52 || Recap
|- style="text-align:center; background:#cfc;"
| 42 || January 16 || @ Columbus || 2–1 ||  || Lundqvist || Nationwide Arena || 16,104 || 25–13–4 || 54 || Recap
|- style="text-align:center; background:#cfc;"
| 43 || January 18 || @ Pittsburgh || 5–2 ||  || Lundqvist || Consol Energy Center || 18,687 || 26–13–4 || 56 || Recap
|- style="text-align:center; background:#cfc;"
| 44 || January 20 ||  Ottawa || 3–2 || OT || Lundqvist || Madison Square Garden || 18,006 || 27–13–4 || 58 || Recap
|- style="text-align:center; background:#fcc;"
| 45 || January 27 || @ NY Islanders || 1–4 ||  || Lundqvist || Nassau Coliseum || 16,170 || 27–14–4 || 58 || Recap
|- style="text-align:center; background:#fcc;"
| 46 || January 29 ||  Montreal || 0–1 ||  || Lundqvist || Madison Square Garden || 18,006 || 27–15–4 || 58 || Recap
|- style="text-align:center; background:#cfc;"
| 47 || January 31 ||  Carolina || 4–1 ||  || Lundqvist || Madison Square Garden || 18,006 || 28–15–4 || 60 || Recap
|-

|- style="text-align:center; background:#cfc;"
| 48 || February 2 || Florida || 6–3 ||  || Lundqvist || Madison Square Garden || 18,006 || 29–15–4 || 62 || Recap
|- style="text-align:center; background:#cfc;"
| 49 || February 4 ||  Boston || 3–2 ||  || Talbot || Madison Square Garden || 18,006 || 30–15–4 || 64 || Recap
|- style="text-align:center; background:#fcc;"
| 50 || February 7 || @ Nashville || 2–3 ||  || Talbot || Bridgestone Arena || 17,329 || 30–16–4 || 64 || Recap
|- style="text-align:center; background:#fff;"
| 51 || February 8 ||  Dallas || 2–3 || OT || Talbot || Madison Square Garden || 18,006 || 30–16–5 || 65 || Recap
|- style="text-align:center; background:#cfc;"
| 52 || February 10 || @ Toronto || 5–4 ||  || Talbot || Air Canada Centre || 18,946 || 31–16–5 || 67 || Recap
|- style="text-align:center; background:#cfc;"
| 53 || February 12 || @ Colorado || 6–3 ||  || Talbot || Pepsi Center || 17,378 || 32–16–5 || 69 || Recap
|- style="text-align:center; background:#cfc;"
| 54 || February 14 || @ Arizona || 5–1 ||  || Talbot || Jobing.com Arena || 14,719 || 33–16–5 || 71 || Recap
|- style="text-align:center; background:#cfc;"
| 55 || February 16 || @ NY Islanders || 6–5 ||  || Talbot || Nassau Coliseum || 16,170 || 34–16–5 || 73 || Recap
|- style="text-align:center; background:#fff;"
| 56 || February 19 ||  Vancouver || 4–5 || SO || Talbot || Madison Square Garden || 18,006 || 34–16–6 || 74 || Recap
|- style="text-align:center; background:#cfc;"
| 57 || February 20 || @ Buffalo || 3-1 ||  || Skapski || First Niagara Center || 19,070 || 35–16–6 || 76 || Recap
|- style="text-align:center; background:#cfc;"
| 58 || February 22 ||  Columbus || 4–3 || SO || Talbot || Madison Square Garden || 18,006 || 36–16–6 || 78 || Recap
|- style="text-align:center; background:#cfc;"
| 59 || February 24 ||  Calgary || 1–0 ||  || Talbot || Madison Square Garden || 18,006 || 37–16–6 || 80 || Recap
|- style="text-align:center; background:#cfc;"
| 60 || February 26 ||  Arizona || 4–3 ||  || Talbot || Madison Square Garden || 18,006 || 38–16–6 || 82 || Recap
|- style="text-align:center; background:#fcc;"
| 61 || February 28 || @ Philadelphia || 2–4 ||  || Talbot || Wells Fargo Center || 19,979 || 38–17–6 || 82 || Recap
|-

|- style="text-align:center; background:#cfc;"
| 62 || March 2 || Nashville || 4–1 ||  || Talbot || Madison Square Garden || 18,006 || 39–17–6 || 84 || Recap
|- style="text-align:center; background:#fff;"
| 63 || March 4 || @ Detroit || 1–2 || OT || Talbot || Joe Louis Arena || 20,027  || 39–17–7 || 85 || Recap
|- style="text-align:center; background:#cfc;"
| 64 || March 8 || @ Chicago || 1–0 || OT || Talbot || United Center || 22,160 || 40–17–7 || 87 || Recap
|- style="text-align:center; background:#cfc;"
| 65 || March 10 || @ NY Islanders || 2–1 ||  || Talbot || Nassau Coliseum || 16,170 || 41–17–7 || 89 || Recap
|- style="text-align:center; background:#cfc;"
| 66 || March 11 || @ Washington || 3–1 ||  || Talbot || Verizon Center || 18,506 || 42–17–7 || 91 || Recap
|- style="text-align:center; background:#cfc;"
| 67 || March 14 || @ Buffalo || 2–0 ||  ||  Skapski|| First Niagara Center || 19,070 || 43–17–7 || 93 || Recap
|- style="text-align:center; background:#cfc;"
| 68 || March 15 ||  Florida || 2–1 ||  || Talbot || Madison Square Garden || 18,006 || 44–17–7 || 95  || Recap
|- style="text-align:center; background:#fcc;"
| 69 || March 18 ||  Chicago || 0–1 ||  || Talbot || Madison Square Garden || 18,006 || 44–18–7 || 95 || Recap
|- style="text-align:center; background:#cfc;"
| 70 || March 21 || @ Carolina || 3–2 || SO || Talbot || PNC Arena || 13,404 || 45–18–7 || 97 || Recap
|- style="text-align:center; background:#cfc;"
| 71 || March 22 ||  Anaheim || 7–2 ||  || Talbot  || Madison Square Garden || 18,006 || 46–18–7|| 99 || Recap
|- style="text-align:center; background:#fcc;"
| 72 || March 24 ||  Los Angeles || 2–4 ||  || Talbot || Madison Square Garden || 18,006 || 46–19–7 || 99 || Recap
|- style="text-align:center; background:#cfc;"
| 73 || March 26 || @ Ottawa || 5–1 ||  || Talbot || Canadian Tire Centre || 17,753 || 47–19–7 || 101 || Recap
|- style="text-align:center; background:#fcc;"
| 74 || March 28 || @ Boston || 2–4 ||  || Lundqvist || TD Garden || 17,565 || 47–20–7 || 101 || Recap
|- style="text-align:center; background:#fcc;"
| 75 || March 29 ||  Washington || 2–5 ||  || Talbot || Madison Square Garden || 18,006 || 47–21–7 || 101 || Recap
|- style="text-align:center; background:#cfc;"
| 76 || March 31 || @ Winnipeg || 3–2 ||  || Lundqvist || MTS Centre || 15,016 || 48–21–7 || 103 || Recap
|-

|- style="text-align:center; background:#cfc;"
| 77 || April 2 || @ Minnesota || 3–2 ||  || Lundqvist || Xcel Energy Center || 19,244 || 49–21–7 || 105  || Recap
|- style="text-align:center; background:#cfc;"
| 78 || April 4 ||  New Jersey || 6–1 ||  || Lundqvist || Madison Square Garden || 18,006 || 50–21–7 || 107 || Recap
|- style="text-align:center; background:#cfc;"
| 79 || April 6 ||  Columbus || 4–3 || OT || Lundqvist || Madison Square Garden || 18,006  || 51–21–7 || 109 || Recap
|- style="text-align:center; background:#cfc;"
| 80 || April 7 || @ New Jersey || 4–2 ||  || Talbot || Prudential Center || 16,592 || 52–21–7 || 111 || Recap
|- style="text-align:center; background:#fcc;"
| 81 || April 9 ||  Ottawa || 0–3 ||  || Lundqvist || Madison Square Garden || 18,006 || 52–22–7 || 111 || Recap
|- style="text-align:center; background:#cfc;"
| 82 || April 11 || @ Washington || 4–2 ||  || Lundqvist || Verizon Center || 18,506 || 53–22–7 || 113 || Recap
|-

|-
|

Playoffs

|-style="text-align:center; background:#cfc;" 
| 1 || April 16 || Pittsburgh Penguins || 2–1 || Lundqvist (1–0) || Rangers lead 1–0
|- style="text-align:center; background:#fcc;"
| 2 || April 18 || Pittsburgh Penguins || 3–4 || Lundqvist (1–1)|| Series tied 1–1
|-style="text-align:center; background:#cfc;" 
| 3 || April 20 || @ Pittsburgh Penguins || 2–1 ||Lundqvist (2–1) || Rangers lead 2–1
|-style="text-align:center; background:#cfc;" 
| 4 || April 22 || @ Pittsburgh Penguins || 2–1  OT || Lundqvist (3–1) || Rangers lead 3–1
|-style="text-align:center; background:#cfc;" 
| 5 || April 24 || Pittsburgh Penguins || 2–1 OT  || Lundqvist (4–1) || Rangers win series 4–1
|-

|- style="text-align:center; background:#fcc;"
| 1 || April 30 || Washington Capitals || 1–2 || Lundqvist (4–2) || Capitals lead 1–0
|-style="text-align:center; background:#cfc;"
| 2 || May 2 || Washington Capitals || 3–2 || Lundqvist (5–2) || Series tied 1–1
|- style="text-align:center; background:#fcc;"
| 3 || May 4 || @ Washington Capitals || 0–1 || Lundqvist (5–3)|| Capitals lead 2–1
|- style="text-align:center; background:#fcc;"
| 4 || May 6 || @ Washington Capitals || 1–2 || Lundqvist (5–4)|| Capitals lead 3–1
|-style="text-align:center; background:#cfc;"
| 5 || May 8 || Washington Capitals || 2–1 OT || Lundqvist (6–4)|| Capitals lead 3–2
|-style="text-align:center; background:#cfc;"
| 6 || May 10 || @ Washington Capitals || 4–3 || Lundqvist (7–4)|| Series tied 3–3
|-style="text-align:center; background:#cfc;"
| 7 || May 13 || Washington Capitals || 2–1 OT || Lundqvist (8–4)|| Rangers win series 4–3
|-

|-style="text-align:center; background:#cfc;"
| 1 || May 16 || Tampa Bay Lightning || 2–1 || Lundqvist (9–4)|| Rangers lead 1–0
|- style="text-align:center; background:#fcc;"
| 2 || May 18 || Tampa Bay Lightning || 2–6 || Lundqvist (9–5)|| Series tied 1–1
|- style="text-align:center; background:#fcc;"
| 3 || May 20 || @ Tampa Bay Lightning || 5–6 OT || Lundqvist (9–6)|| Lightning lead 2–1
|-style="text-align:center; background:#cfc;"
| 4 || May 22 || @ Tampa Bay Lightning || 5–1 || Lundqvist (10–6)|| Series tied 2–2
|- style="text-align:center; background:#fcc;"
| 5 || May 24 || Tampa Bay Lightning || 0–2 || Lundqvist (10–7) || Lightning lead 3–2
|-style="text-align:center; background:#cfc;"
| 6 || May 26 || @ Tampa Bay Lightning || 7–3 || Lundqvist (11–7) || Series tied 3–3
|- style="text-align:center; background:#fcc;"
| 7 || May 29 || Tampa Bay Lightning || 0–2 || Lundqvist (11–8) || Lightning win series 4–3
|-

|-
|

Player statistics
Final Stats
Skaters

Goaltenders

†Denotes player spent time with another team before joining the Rangers. Stats reflect time with the Rangers only.
‡Denotes player was traded mid-season. Stats reflect time with the Rangers only.
Bold/italics denotes franchise record.

Player injuries
Updated as of May 2, 2015

Player suspensions/fines

Awards and records

Awards

Milestones

Transactions
The Rangers have been involved in the following transactions during the 2014–15 season:

Trades

Free agents acquired

Free agents lost

Claimed via waivers

Lost via waivers

Lost via retirement

Player signings

Other

Draft picks

Below are the New York Rangers' selections made at the 2014 NHL Entry Draft, held on June 27–28, 2014 at the Wells Fargo Center in Philadelphia.

Draft notes
 The Rangers' first-round pick went to the Tampa Bay Lightning as the result of a trade on March 5, 2014, that sent Martin St. Louis to New York in exchange for Ryan Callahan, a first-round pick in 2015 and this pick (being conditional at the time of the trade). The condition – Tampa Bay will receive a first-round pick in 2014 if the Rangers advance to the 2014 Eastern Conference Final – was converted on May 13, 2014.
  The Anaheim Ducks' third-round pick went to the New York Rangers as the result of a trade on June 27, 2014, that sent Derek Dorsett to Vancouver in exchange for this pick.    Vancouver previously acquired this pick as the result of a trade on June 27, 2014, that sent Ryan Kesler and a third-round pick in 2015 to Anaheim in exchange for Nick Bonino, Luca Sbisa, a first-round pick in 2014 (24th overall) and this pick.
 The New York Rangers' third-round pick went to the Washington Capitals as the result of a trade on June 28, 2014, that sent a fourth-round pick in 2014 (104th overall) and Chicago's fourth-round pick in 2014 (118th overall) to New York in exchange for this pick.
  The Washington Capitals' fourth-round pick went to the New York Rangers as the result of a trade on June 28, 2014, that sent a third-round pick in 2014 (89th overall) to Washington in exchange for Chicago's fourth-round pick in 2014 (118th overall) and this pick.
  The Chicago Blackhawks' fourth-round pick went to the New York Rangers as the result of a trade on June 28, 2014, that sent a third-round pick in 2014 (89th overall) to Washington in exchange for a fourth-round pick in 2014 (104th overall) and this pick.     Washington previously acquired this pick as the result of a trade on May 1, 2014, that sent Jaroslav Halak to the New York Islanders in exchange for this pick.     New York previously acquired this pick as the result of a trade on February 6, 2014, that sent Peter Regin and Pierre-Marc Bouchard to Chicago in exchange for this pick.
 The New York Rangers' fourth-round pick went to the Tampa Bay Lightning as the result of a trade on June 28, 2014, that sent a fifth-round pick in 2014 (120th overall) and St. Louis' fifth-round pick in 2014 (142nd overall) to New York in exchange for this pick.
  The Florida Panthers' fifth-round pick will go to the Rangers as the result of a trade on July 20, 2012 that sent Casey Wellman to Florida in exchange for this pick.
 The Tampa Bay Lightning's fifth-round pick went to the New York Rangers as the result of a trade on June 28, 2014, that sent a fourth-round pick in 2014 (119th overall) to Tampa Bay in exchange for St. Louis' fifth-round pick in 2014 (142nd overall) and this pick.
 The St. Louis Blues' fifth-round pick went to the New York Rangers as the result of a trade on June 28, 2014, that sent a fourth-round pick in 2014 (119th overall) to Tampa Bay in exchange for a fifth-round pick in 2014 (140th overall) and this pick.     Tampa Bay previously acquired this pick as the result of a trade on July 10, 2012, that sent fourth-round picks in 2013 and 2014 to St. Louis in exchange for B. J. Crombeen and this pick.
 The Rangers' fifth-round pick will go to the San Jose Sharks as the result of a trade on April 2, 2013, that sent Ryane Clowe to New York in exchange for a second-round pick in 2013, Florida's third-round pick in 2013 and this pick (being conditional at the time of the trade). The condition – If Clowe does not re-sign with New York and the Rangers do not advance to the Eastern Conference Final, then San Jose will receive a fifth-round pick in 2014 – was converted on July 5, 2013.
 The New York Rangers' sixth-round pick went to the Chicago Blackhawks as the result of a trade on June 27, 2014, that sent a first-round pick and Florida's third-round pick both in 2014 (27th and 62nd overall) to San Jose in exchange for a first-round pick in 2014 (20th overall) and this pick.     San Jose previously acquired this pick as the result of a trade on January 16, 2013, that sent Brandon Mashinter to New York in exchange for Tommy Grant and this pick (being conditional at the time of the trade). The condition – San Jose will receive a sixth-round pick in 2014 if Mashinter was a signed player on the Rangers reserve list at some point during the 2013–14 NHL season. – was converted on August 5, 2013, when Mashinter re-signed with the Rangers for the 2013–14 NHL season.
 The Rangers' seventh-round pick will go to the Los Angeles Kings as result of a trade on January 4, 2014, that sent Daniel Carcillo to New York in exchange for this conditional pick.

References

New York Rangers seasons
New York Rangers
New York Rangers
New York Rangers
New York Rangers
 in Manhattan
Madison Square Garden
Presidents' Trophy seasons